Leucopogon affinis, commonly known as lance beard-heath and formerly known as Leucopogon lanceolatus is a flowering plant in the heath family Ericaceae and is endemic to eastern Australia, including Tasmania and South Australia. It is an erect shrub with spikes of small white flowers in early spring, followed by orange-red fruit.

Description
They are almost stalkless, have a narrow base, a pointed tip, fine striations on the lower surface and the edges sometimes have fine teeth near the tip.

The flowers are arranged in spikes on the ends of the branches and in the upper leaf axils.

Taxonomy and naming
Leucopogon affinis was first formally described by Robert Brown in 1810 and the description was published in Prodromus Florae Novae Hollandiae. The specific epithet (affinis) is a Latin word meaning "related to", "neighboring" or "bordering".

The plant was formerly known as Leucopogon lanceolatus (Sm.) R.Br. but this is now recognised as a nomen illegitimum by the Australian Plant Census.

Distribution and habitat
This leucopogon mainly grows in open forests and woodland, sometimes in moist gullies or in swampy areas, on a range of soils. It occurs in south-east Queensland, the coast and adjacent ranges of New South Wales, far south-eastern South Australia and on some of the islands in Bass Strait although not on the Tasmanian mainland.

References

affinis
Ericales of Australia
Flora of New South Wales
Flora of Queensland
Flora of South Australia
Flora of Tasmania
Flora of Victoria (Australia)
Plants described in 1810